Eurymermis is a genus of nematodes belonging to the family Mermithidae.

The genus was first described by Müller in 1931.

Species:
 Eurymermis arkhanhelsis Rubtsov, 1981
 Eurymermis chrysopidis
 Eurymermis habermanii Rubtsov, 1973
 Eurymermis intermedia Rubtsov, 1973
 Eurymermis lacustris Rubtsov, 1973
 Eurymermis muticata Rubtsov, 1980
 Eurymermis stratiomyi Bekturganov, Gubaidulin & Dubitskij, 1991
 Eurymermis tchaunensis Vosylyte, 1982
 Eurymermis ventricosa Rubtsov, 1973

References

Nematodes